"Lightning Does the Work" is a song by American country music artist Chad Brock.  It was released in March 1999 as the third and final single from his self-titled debut album.  The song reached  19 on the Billboard Hot Country Singles & Tracks chart.  The song was written by Brock, John Hadley and Kelly Garrett.

Music video
The music video was directed by Guy Guillet, and premiered in March, 1999. It features Brock wearing a ball cap, as he uses a tool to make the metal in his barn for the lightning, and driving a pickup truck. Scenes also feature him singing the song in a dark room full of blue smoke. During the instrumental break, Brock puts his goggles on as he watches the lightning kick into the back of the truck, and driving his pickup truck again. He stands outside, and the video ends.

Chart performance

Year-end charts

References

1999 singles
1998 songs
Chad Brock songs
Song recordings produced by Buddy Cannon
Song recordings produced by Norro Wilson
Warner Records singles
Songs written by Kelly Garrett (songwriter)